The Italian Grand Masters is a darts tournament held in Pieve di Cento, Italy, currently sanctioned by the World Darts Federation. It was established in 2009, being the most important darts tournament held in Italy. It was jointly held with the Italian Open the same weekend.

List of winners

Men's

Women's

Italian Open

Men's

Women's

References

Darts tournaments
Darts in Italy
Sports competitions in Italy
Recurring sporting events established in 1999
1999 establishments in Italy